Frauenfeld railway station is a railway station in the Swiss canton of Thurgau and municipality of Frauenfeld. The station is located on the Winterthur–Romanshorn railway line, and is the terminus of the narrow-gauge Frauenfeld–Wil railway line.

On the main line, Frauenfeld is an intermediate stop on the InterCity service from Brig to Romanshorn, the InterRegio service from Lucerne to Konstanz, and on Zürich S-Bahn services S24 and S30.

St. Gallen S-Bahn S15 trains on the Frauenfeld–Wil railway line terminate in the Bahnhofplatz square in front of the station.

Layout and connections 
The station has an island platform and a side platform on the Winterthur–Romanshorn line, serving tracks 1–3. The Frauenfeld–Wil railway terminates in the Bahnhofplatz square in front of the station. There is a single side platform, and the track is numbered 11. PostAuto Schweiz
and  operate bus services from the station.

Services 
 the following services stop at Frauenfeld:

 Zürich S-Bahn
: peak-hour service between Zürich main station and  via .
 St. Gallen S-Bahn

References

External links 
 
 

Frauenfeld
Frauenfeld